Conus sertacinctus is a species of sea snail, a marine gastropod mollusk in the family Conidae, the cone snails and their allies.

Like all species within the genus Conus, these snails are predatory and venomous. They are capable of "stinging" humans, therefore live ones should be handled carefully or not at all.

Description
Conus sertacinctus is a small to medium-sized shell (25–35 mm) which is solid although light weight. The spire is medium in height and straight to slightly concave in outline.

Distribution
Conus sertacinctus occurs off the Solomon Islands. It is not uncommon around the island of Guadalcanal.; off the Philippines and Southern India

References

 Röckel, D., 1986. Conus sertacinctus n. sp. von den Salomonen. Archiv für Molluskenkunde, 141: 225–231

External links
 The Conus Biodiversity website
 Cone Shells – Knights of the Sea
 

sertacinctus
Gastropods described in 1986